Tommie Lee Aaron (August 5, 1939 – August 16, 1984) was an American professional baseball player and coach. He played as a first baseman and left fielder in Major League Baseball. Aaron was the younger brother of Hall of Fame member Hank Aaron. They were the first siblings to appear in a League Championship Series as teammates.

Baseball 
Born in Mobile, Alabama, Aaron was signed by the Milwaukee Braves on May 28, 1958, at the age of 18. He played for both the Milwaukee Braves (1962–1963, 1965) and the Atlanta Braves (1968–1971). During the course of his development as a player, Tommie Aaron played for the Richmond Braves of the International League in the mid-1960s, where he was International League MVP in 1967.  After his playing days, he worked for the organization as a minor league manager (1973–1978) and major league coach (1979–1984).

Aaron hit a total of 13 major league home runs, with eight of them coming in his first year of 1962. Along with his brother's then Major League record 755, they hold the Major League record for the most career home runs by two brothers (768). The only other brother of a 500-home run man to play in the majors was Rich Murray (brother of Eddie Murray), who hit four home runs in a brief major league career.

Aaron finished his career with a lifetime batting average of .229, 13 HR, 94 RBI, and 102 runs scored in 437 games. He died of leukemia in 1984 and was buried in the Catholic Cemetery of Mobile, Alabama.

Aaron was married to Carolyn Davenporte on October 13, 1962. They had three children: Efrem; Tommie, Jr.; and Veleeta.

Posthumously the Richmond Braves established the Tommie Aaron Memorial Award for the team's most valuable player, awarded annually until the affiliate relocated to Georgia for the 2009 season.  The Braves' AAA club (now the Gwinnett Stripers), have retired his No. 23.

Career statistics

References

External links 

Tommie Aaron at The Deadball Era

1939 births
1984 deaths
African-American baseball coaches
African-American baseball players
Atlanta Braves coaches
Atlanta Braves players
Atlanta Crackers players
Austin Senators players
Baseball coaches from Alabama
Baseball players from Alabama
Burials at the Catholic Cemetery (Mobile, Alabama)
Cedar Rapids Braves players
Deaths from cancer in Georgia (U.S. state)
Deaths from leukemia
Denver Bears players
Eau Claire Braves players
International League MVP award winners
Jacksonville Braves players
Louisville Colonels (minor league) players
Major League Baseball first base coaches
Major League Baseball first basemen
Major League Baseball left fielders
Milwaukee Braves players
Minor league baseball managers
Richmond Braves players
Savannah Braves players
Baseball players from Atlanta
Sportspeople from Mobile, Alabama
Tigres de Aragua players
American expatriate baseball players in Venezuela
20th-century African-American sportspeople